Canada and Greece first exchanged ambassadors in 1942. Both countries are members of the Organisation for Economic Co-operation and Development, Organisation internationale de la Francophonie, Organization for Security and Co-operation in Europe, NATO and the United Nations. There is a strong Greek community living in Canada.

History
Greek immigration to Canada began in 1843 when Greek migrants began arriving and settling in Montreal. By 1941, over 5,000 Greek migrants resided in Canada. During World War II both nations fought alongside each other during the Italian Campaign. In 1942, Canada established diplomatic relations with the Greek government-in-exile.  Soon afterwards, the two nations opened diplomatic missions in each other's respective capitals.

Today, over 243,000 Canadians claim Greek descent. In 2012, both nations celebrated 70 years since the establishment of mutual diplomatic relations.

List of bilateral treaties and agreements

 Agreement on Taxation of Shipping companies (1929)
 Agreement on Social Security (1981)
 Agreement on Regular Air Transport (1987)
 Revised Agreement on Regular Air Transport
 Agreement on the Avoidance of double taxation

Trade relations
Canada's main exports to Greece are paper, furs, machinery, vegetables, aircraft and pharmaceutical products. Canadian merchandise imports from Greece include preserved food products, aluminium, fats and oils, and fertilizers.
Greece's business community with relations to Canada and Canadian companies operating in Greece set up the Hellenic-Canadian Chamber of Commerce in 1996, whose mission is to foster the development of business relations between the two countries in trade, finance, services and investments.

Bilateral merchandise trade between Canada and Greece reached $303 million CAD in 2014. Canadian exports to Greece totaled $117 million CAD, led by furs, vegetables and pharmaceutical products. Greek exports to Canada totaled $186 million CAD in 2014, led by food products, fats, oil (not crude) and iron/steel.

Resident diplomatic missions
 Canada has an embassy in Athens.
 Greece has an embassy in Ottawa and consulates-general in Montreal, Toronto and Vancouver.

See also
Embassy of Greece in Ottawa
Greek Canadians
Canada–European Union relations
Comprehensive Economic and Trade Agreement

Notes

External links 
 Greek Ministry of Foreign Affairs about the relation with Canada

 
Greece
Canada